The Eyes of Alice Cooper, released in 2003, is the sixteenth solo album by American rock musician Alice Cooper. With this album, Cooper returned to his earlier hard rock sound, in the vein of The Last Temptation, and left the heavy industrial metal sound found in his last two studio albums. Of note is the album cover, which was released in four different versions, featuring alternate colours in Cooper's eyes and the crescent around the 'A' in the title. It was available in blue, green, purple and red.

In the 2010 Behind the Music Remastered on Alice Cooper, "Between High School & Old School" was described as "a modern Alice Cooper classic" for its return to the topic of school (a reference to "School's Out").

Track listing

Personnel
Alice Cooper - vocals
Eric Dover - guitar
Ryan Roxie - guitar, backing vocals, part-lead vocals on "What Do You Want from Me?"
Chuck Garric - bass
Eric Singer - drums
Wayne Kramer - additional guitar on "Detroit City"
Calico Cooper - voice and theremin

Trivia
 Creem, Ted Nugent, Iggy Pop, The MC5, Eminem, Kid Rock, Insane Clown Posse, Bob Seger, The Silver Bullet Band and David Bowie (as Ziggy Stardust), and WRIF radio are all mentioned in the song "Detroit City". Also, Kiss might be referenced in the second verse, referring to the front and back cover of Destroyer, though it may also be referring to the 1967 Detroit riot.

References 

Alice Cooper albums
2003 albums
Spitfire Records albums